Bedford Girls' School (BGS) is a private school for girls which opened in September 2010 located in Bedford, in the English county of Bedfordshire. The school is a result of a merger of Bedford High School and Dame Alice Harpur School, and is operated by the Harpur Trust. The school became fully operational in September 2012.

History
The Harpur Trust had a long history of providing education for boys in Bedford, and in 1882 it opened two schools for girls, Bedford High School and Bedford Girls' Modern School (later renamed Dame Alice Harpur School), on the same site at Bromham Road, Bedford. While Bedford High School remained at the site, the Girls' Modern School moved to Bedford town centre by the end of the 19th century, and then in 1938 it relocated to Cardington Road, where new buildings were built on part of the playing fields the school already owned there. In 1946 it changed its name to Dame Alice Harpur School, in honour of the wife of the founder of the Harpur Trust.

In July 2009, the Harpur Trust announced its intention to merge Bedford High School and Dame Alice Harpur School, a decision arrived at because both schools had seen a fall in pupil numbers over the previous twenty years: In 1990 more than 2,000 girls had been on the rolls of the two schools, while in 2009 there were only 1,500. The trust estimated that once started, it would take three to five years to merge the schools.

In November 2009, the trust released further details of the merger. It was announced that the new merged school would be called Bedford Girls' School and would be located on the current site of Dame Alice Harpur School. It would offer the International Baccalaureate as part of its curriculum, but would not offer boarding facilities for pupils.

In December 2009, Jo MacKenzie was appointed as the first head of the Bedford Girls' School. MacKenzie assumed her post over Easter 2010. The junior department of the school opened in September 2010, when the junior schools of Bedford High and Dame Alice Harper merged on the Cardington Road site. The senior department of the school opened in September 2011, with the full merger of the old schools, including the sixth form departments completed in September 2012.

In September 2020, the Chairman and Board of Governors of Bedford Girls’ School appointed Gemma Gibson as Headmistress, where she succeeded Jo MacKenzie, who dedicated ten years to creating an exceptional school. Gibson joined Bedford Girls' School from Harrow Hong Kong where she was Deputy Head (Academic).

Sport
Bedford Girls' School consistently ranks amongst girls’ schools for sport in the UK, with the School Sport Magazine ranking BGS as the second best all girls’ independent school for sport in 2018. Overall Bedford Girls' School is placed eighth on the list of all co-educational and single sex independent schools, rising two places from 2017.

BGS’ key to success is providing an outstanding sporting education where every girl has the opportunity to flourish and reach her potential as a sportswoman. Students have the ability to improve and progress on the sports pitch, just as they do in the classroom. The school employs an open-door policy for sport and from the beginning of Year 3, all students to take part in a variety of sports at all levels, helping them to develop holistically and embed technical skills.

As well as spotting and developing outstanding talent, staff have the specialist knowledge, personal experience and creativity to ensure all girls benefit from the manifold benefits of regular participation in sport. As a result, pupils gain a sense of genuine pride, self-worth, happiness and achievement they will carry onto university and beyond.

Cople Fields
Opened on Wednesday 7 September 2016, Cople Fields boasts six full size lacrosse pitches, which are also used for rounders, and a modern pavilion, offering large changing rooms and an impressive viewing gallery. As one of the UK's premier girls’ schools for sports, Bedford Girls’ School also hosts regional and national lacrosse tournaments at Cople Fields.

Granted planning permission in the summer of 2014, the School enlisted the services of Northamptonshire-based S.A.C. Construction Ltd to construct the new sporting facility on the 30-acre site, sitting on the outskirts of the village.

In addition to laying new pitches and building the pavilion, the two-year project has included undertaking an archaeological survey, managing the migration of Greater Crested Newts to a newly created pond, planting a community orchard and installing swift boxes. The site will also be used as an outdoor learning space, providing pupils with an alternative environment to study in.

Rowing
The school has an active rowing club called the Bedford Girls' School Rowing Club which is based on the River Great Ouse at the Harpur Trust Boathouse in Bedford The club is affiliated to British Rowing.

Houses
The House System is designed to embody the values and ethos of the school and is an integral part of the Bedford Girls' School community. The houses are:
Austen (Red), Chanel (Purple), Franklin (Yellow), Hepburn (Blue), Nightingale (Green) and Parks (Orange).

The house names were chosen by the Senior School pupils selecting them from historical, inspirational and iconic women of the 19th and 20th Centuries, whilst the Junior School pupils chose the colours each house is associated with. All girls are placed into one of the six houses on entry to Bedford Girls’ School. The vertical grouping of the girls in their Houses allows them to work with girls of all ages and give support and inspiration to younger girls as well as foster a sense of family and community. The healthy competition between houses allows girls to work as a team aiming for the success of the House in all challenges, activities and competitions.

References

External links
 Bedford Girls' School website homepage

Private schools in the Borough of Bedford
Girls' schools in Bedfordshire
Educational institutions established in 2010
International Baccalaureate schools in England
2010 establishments in England
Member schools of the Girls' Schools Association
Schools in Bedford